Progress 23 was a Soviet uncrewed Progress cargo spacecraft, which was launched in August 1984 to resupply the Salyut 7 space station.

Launch
Progress 23 launched on 14 August 1984 from the Baikonur Cosmodrome in the Kazakh SSR. It used a Soyuz-U rocket.

Docking
Progress 23 docked with the aft port of Salyut 7 on 16 August 1984 at 08:11 UTC, and was undocked on 26 August 1984 at 16:13 UTC.

Decay
It remained in orbit until 28 August 1984, when it was deorbited. The deorbit burn occurred at 01:28 UTC, with the mission ending at around 02:15 UTC.

See also

 1984 in spaceflight
 List of Progress missions
 List of uncrewed spaceflights to Salyut space stations

References

Progress (spacecraft) missions
1984 in the Soviet Union
Spacecraft launched in 1984
Spacecraft which reentered in 1984
Spacecraft launched by Soyuz-U rockets